The Iowa general elections, 2016 were held in the U.S. state of Iowa on November 8, 2016. One of Iowa's U.S. Senate seats and all four seats in the United States House of Representatives were up for election, as well as half of the Iowa Senate seats and all of the Iowa House of Representatives seats. Primary elections were held on June 7, 2016.

The Iowa Republican Party made large gains in the election, increasing its majority in the State House and taking control of the State Senate, giving the state a Republican trifecta for the first time since 1996.

U.S. Senate

Incumbent Republican Senator Chuck Grassley sought re-election to a seventh term. Grassley defeated Democratic nominee Patty Judge and several third-party candidates in the general election, winning 60.09% of the vote.

U.S. House of Representatives

All of Iowa's four seats in the United States House of Representatives were up for election in November. Party control remained unchanged after the general election.

Iowa Senate

The 25 even-numbered Iowa Senate seats were up for election.

Iowa House of Representatives
All 100 seats in the Iowa House of Representatives were up for election.

References

 
Iowa